Takab County, or Tekab County is in West Azerbaijan province, Iran. The capital of the county is the city of Takab. At the 2006 census, the county's population was 81,395 in 17,618 households. The following census in 2011 counted 78,122 people in 20,184 households. At the 2016 census, the county's population was 80,556 in 23,482 households.

Administrative divisions

The population history of Takab County's administrative divisions over three consecutive censuses is shown in the following table. The latest census shows two districts, six rural districts, and one city.

References

 

Counties of West Azerbaijan Province